The 2010 Atlantic Cup (known as the Hotels of Jacksonville Atlantic Cup for sponsorship purposes) was an international rugby league tournament played in Jacksonville, Florida, U.S. The competing teams were the United States, Jamaica and Canada.

The 2010 tournament is the second staging of the Atlantic Cup.  The inaugural fixture was won by the United States, who defeated Jamaica 37–22.  With the addition of Canada, the format of the tournament was changed from a single match to a round robin with no final.  The United States retained the trophy by winning both of their games. Super League referee Phil Bentham was in charge of refereeing all three matches. Like the previous year's tournament, the 2010 match was held at Hodges Stadium at the University of North Florida.

USA's Australian-raised halfback Damien O’Malveney was named player of the tournament.

Squads

Jamaica

United States

Canada

Round 1

United States vs Jamaica

Round 2

Canada vs Jamaica

Round 3

United States vs Canada

References

Atlantic Cup
Atlantic Cup